Suk Hyun-jun (or  ; born 29 June 1991) is a South Korean professional footballer who plays as a forward for Jeonju Citizen.

Club career

Ajax
After initially trialling with Eredivisie side Ajax, Suk signed 1.5-year contract with the Dutch club in October 2010. The contract effective from 1 January 2010 also included the option for Ajax to extend by another year. He made his debut in the first team in February as a substitute in a 4–0 home win against Roda JC.

He scored his first Ajax goal in a 2010–11 pre-season friendly win against Chelsea on 23 July 2010. He did not play in any official first-team matches during the 2010–11 season and his contract at Ajax was not renewed.

Groningen
On 27 June 2011, Suk signed a two-year contract with Groningen including an option for a two-year extension. He scored five goals in his first season with Groningen including two goals against PSV Eindhoven, showing the potential for growth. However, he did not score in the next season and had to leave the club.

Marítimo
In January 2013, Suk signed with Primeira Liga club Marítimo. He netted his first goal for Marítimo in his third match, a 1–0 win against Sporting CP. He scored his second goal in a 1–1 draw with Porto. He moved to Saudi club Al-Ahli after making four goals for half a year in Marítimo. Vítor Pereira, the new Al-Ahli manager and previous Porto manager, was interested in Suk's performance in Portugal.

Vitória de Setúbal
Suk joined Nacional after having an unsuccessful time in Al-Ahli due to a toe injury. However, he also failed to settle in Nacional, and transferred to another Portuguese club Vitória de Setúbal on 12 January 2015.

During the 2014–15 season, he achieved double-digit goals in a season for the first time by scoring five goals for Vitória in addition to five goals for Nacional. In the next season, he spent his prime by scoring 11 goals during the first half of the season. On 2 January 2016, he scored an unstoppable free-kick only four minutes into a match against Braga.

Porto
Suk moved to Porto on 15 January 2016 after his great performances in Setúbal. However, his transfer to Porto was not good choice as a result. His flow was stopped for the rest of the season, and he moved to Trabzonspor on 11 August 2016 on a one-year loan with an option to sign permanently. According to Trabzonspor's stock market report the fee paid to Porto by Trabzonspor was €750,000 and Suk was going to make more than €1 million a year.

On 31 January 2017, after half a season at Trabzonspor and not finding much success, Suk's loan was cut short. The same day, a move to Bastia broke down although a loan agreement with Porto had been signed. The reason given by Bastia was that administrative documents had not been transferred in time.

On 14 February 2017, Suk joined Hungarian side Debrecen on loan for the rest of the season.

Troyes 
On 30 August 2017, Suk was again sent on loan, joining Ligue 1 club Troyes for 2017–18 season. Suk made his first goal for Troyes in his fifth Ligue 1 appearance against Strasbourg. Afterwards, he scored in subsequent two league matches, starting the season strong. On 9 December, he scored two goals against Monaco with his concentration on the ball. However, in a league match against Angers on 17 January 2018, he suffered an ankle injury that saw him sidelined for over a month. He eventually lost his previous form after the injury, adding only one goal for the remainder of the season.

In June 2018, after being relegated to Ligue 2, Troyes signed Suk permanently. He played the first league match of the season. In August 2018, Suk moved to Reims, who had been promoted to Ligue 1 for the 2018–19 season. Reims paid Troyes a transfer fee of €2.75 million plus €4 million in potential bonuses.

However, Suk returned to Troyes in January 2020 after disappointing Reims. In July 2022, his contract with the club was terminated.

Jeonju Citizen 
Suk was largely criticised for trying to evade his mandatory military service since April 2019. He was on the list of draft dodgers of the Military Manpower Administration in December 2020 by rejecting their demand for his return.

After he left from Troyes, he returned to South Korea and started to stand trial. On 24 February 2023, Suk joined K4 League club Jeonju Citizen during the trial. He could play for Jeonju Citizen before the court judgement, and could continue to play as a social service agent if the court did not disallow his alternative service.

International career
In November 2009, Suk took part in the 2010 AFC U-19 Championship qualification.

On 7 September 2010, Suk made his senior international debut in a friendly against Iran.

Suk played for South Korean under-23 team as an over-aged player in the 2016 Summer Olympics. He scored twice against Fiji, and once against Germany.

Personal life
Suk is a devout Christian. Some people have mistakenly thought that Suk was Muslim due to his goal celebration resembling the Salat. However, Suk himself said this was not true and that his celebration was modeled after Kaká's. Suk's tendency to visibly pray in matches has occasionally been criticized by Korean pundits and fans.

Suk also has two visible sleeve tattoos on his arms.

During his time at Porto, Suk became good friends with Spanish goalkeeping legend Iker Casillas.

On 13 March 2020, during the COVID-19 pandemic, it was confirmed that Suk had tested positive for the coronavirus in Italy.

Career statistics

Club

International
Scores and results list South Korea's goal tally first, score column indicates score after each Suk goal.

Honours
Ajax
KNVB Cup: 2009–10

Al-Ahli
King Cup runner-up: 2014

Porto
Taça de Portugal runner-up: 2015–16

Troyes
 Ligue 2: 2020–21

Individual
Primeira Liga Goal of the Month: August/September 2015

References

External links
 
 Suk Hyun-jun – National Team Stats at KFA 
 

1991 births
Living people
People from Chungju
Association football forwards
South Korean footballers
South Korea international footballers
Footballers at the 2016 Summer Olympics
Olympic footballers of South Korea
AFC Ajax players
FC Groningen players
C.S. Marítimo players
Al-Ahli Saudi FC players
C.D. Nacional players
Vitória F.C. players
FC Porto players
Trabzonspor footballers
Debreceni VSC players
ES Troyes AC players
Stade de Reims players
Eredivisie players
Primeira Liga players
Süper Lig players
Nemzeti Bajnokság I players
Ligue 1 players
Ligue 2 players
K4 League players
Saudi Professional League players
South Korean expatriate footballers
South Korean expatriate sportspeople in the Netherlands
Expatriate footballers in the Netherlands
South Korean expatriate sportspeople in Portugal
Expatriate footballers in Portugal
South Korean expatriate sportspeople in Saudi Arabia
Expatriate footballers in Saudi Arabia
South Korean expatriate sportspeople in Turkey
Expatriate footballers in Turkey
South Korean expatriate sportspeople in Hungary
Expatriate footballers in Hungary
South Korean expatriate sportspeople in France
Expatriate footballers in France
South Korean Christians
Chungju Seok clan
Sportspeople from North Chungcheong Province